Neckarsulmer SU is a German sports club from the town of Neckarsulm, Baden-Württemberg. The football club's greatest success has been promotion to the tier five Oberliga Baden-Württemberg in 2016 and participation in the first round of the 2013–14 DFB-Pokal.

The club also has, among many others, a rugby union department, with the team playing in the 2. Rugby-Bundesliga since 2012.

The women's handball team played in the Bundesliga.

Football

History 
The origins of the club date back to 1908 when two football clubs were formed in Neckarsulm, Phoenix 08 and 1. FC Neckarsulm. Two years later the two clubs merged to form Sportverein Neckarsulm.

After years of playing in the lower amateur leagues of Württemberg the club won promotion to the tier three Amateurliga Württemberg in 1958. In 1960 this league was split into two regional divisions and Neckarsulm became part of the new Amateurliga Nordwürttemberg. It was relegated from this level again in 1961 but returned the following season. After three seasons as a lower table side the club was relegated again in 1965. Before that, in 1964, it won the Württemberg Cup for the first time, something the club repeated in 1969.

In the following decades Neckarsulm returned to the lower amateur leagues, fluctuating between the Kreisliga, Bezirksliga and Landesliga. On 1 January 2009 Sportvereinigung Neckarsulm merged with Sportfreunde Neckarsulm to form the Neckarsulmer Sport-Union. In 2013, after a Landesliga title, the new club won promotion to the Verbandsliga Württemberg for the first time.

The club qualified for the first round of the 2013–14 DFB-Pokal, the German Cup, as the runners-up of the Württemberg Cup, taking up Dynamo Dresden's spot after the latter had been banned from the competition. Neckarsulm lost 7–0 to Kaiserslautern in the first round and was knocked out.

After three Verbandsliga seasons from 2013 to 2016 the club won the league in 2015–16 and won promotion to the tier five Oberliga Baden-Württemberg for the first time.

Honours
 Verbandsliga Württemberg
 Champions: 2015–16
 Landesliga Württemberg I
 Champions: 2012–13
 Bezirksliga Unterland
 Champions: 2005–06, 2008–09
 Württemberg Cup
 Winners: 1963–64, 1968–69

Recent seasons 
The recent season-by-season performance of the club:

 With the introduction of the 3. Liga in 2008 as the new third tier, below the 2. Bundesliga, all leagues below dropped one tier. results before 2009 are for the Sportvereinigung Neckarsulm.

References

External links 
Official website 
Official website of the football department 
Official website of the rugby union department 
Neckarsulmer SU at Weltfussball.de 

Football clubs in Germany
Football clubs in Baden-Württemberg
Association football clubs established in 2009
2009 establishments in Germany